The Love Boat is an American television series that aired from 1977 to 1986.

(The) Love Boat or loveboat may also refer to:

Music
 Loveboat (album), an album by Erasure
 "Love Boat" (song), a theme song for the television series of the same name, sung by Jack Jones
 "Loveboat", song by Kylie Minogue from Light Years

Television
 Love Boat: The Next Wave, a 1998–99 television series
 "The Loveboat", a 1996 episode of The Red Green Show
 "The Love Boat", a 2001 episode of Two Guys and a Girl
 "The Love Boat", a 2013 episode of Revolution

Other uses
 Love Boat (study tour), the Taiwanese youth program
 Pacific Princess (1971), a Princess Cruises ship featured on the original TV show that itself became known as the "Love Boat"

See also 

 
 The Real Love Boat, a reality-television reimagined version of the original TV drama
 Love (disambiguation)
 Boat (disambiguation)